Jonathan Ayola Ursin Rasheed (born 21 November 1991) is a Swedish professional footballer who plays as a goalkeeper for Swedish club BK Häcken.

Club career 
Rasheed started his youth career in Kortedala IF, played junior football for GAIS and started his senior career in Qviding FIF. After two years with limited play in third-tier IF Sylvia he moved to Norwegian Stabæk Fotball as second-choice goalkeeper. Not featuring once for the first team, in 2014 he was signed by Alta IF, but did not play more than once there either.

In 2015 and 2016 he was finally a first-choice goalkeeper, first for Norwegian second-tier side Follo FK and then for Swedish second-tiers IFK Värnamo. He was brought to BK Häcken and finally made his debut in a fully professional league in 2018. He missed all of 2019 due to injury.

Personal life
Rasheed was born in Sweden to a Nigerian father and a Norwegian mother.

Honours 
BK Häcken

 Allsvenskan: 2022

References

1991 births
Living people
Footballers from Gothenburg
Swedish footballers
Swedish people of Nigerian descent
Swedish people of Norwegian descent
Association football goalkeepers
Qviding FIF players
IF Sylvia players
Stabæk Fotball players
Alta IF players
Ljungskile SK players
Follo FK players
IFK Värnamo players
BK Häcken players
Ettan Fotboll players
Superettan players
Allsvenskan players
Norwegian First Division players